The Chyphotidae are a family of wasps similar to the Mutillidae, differing most visibly in the presence, in females, of a suture separating the pronotum from the mesonotum. These species are found primarily in arid regions in the southwestern United States and adjacent regions in Mexico.

Taxonomy 
Recent classifications of Vespoidea sensu lato (beginning in 2008) removed two of the five genera formerly placed in the family Bradynobaenidae to a separate family Chyphotidae, thus restricting true bradynobaenids to the Old World, with chyphotids being restricted to the New World.

Genera 
 Chyphotes Blake, 1886
 Typhoctes Ashmead, 1899

References

External links 

Thynnoidea
Apocrita families